First Cut is the first video album by Japanese recording artist Mai Kuraki. It was released on DVD and VHS on November 8, 2000 by B-Vision, simultaneously with her single "Reach for the Sky". The video brought a collection of Kuraki's music videos and making videos. The album became the second best-selling video album (DVD) of 2000 in Japan.

Commercial performance 
The album sold over 99,000 copies in its first week and debuted at number one on the Oricon weekly video albums chart. It became the highest first-week video album sales by female singers in Japan until Namie Amuro update the record with Namie Amuro Best Fiction Tour 2008–2009 in 2009. First Cut has sold over 232,000 copies so far.

Track listing

References

2000 video albums
Mai Kuraki albums